The 1915–16 Swiss International Ice Hockey Championship was the first edition of the international ice hockey championship in Switzerland. Six teams participated in the championship, which was won by Akademischer EHC Zürich, who defeated Club des Patineurs Lausanne in the final.

First round

Group 1

Group 2

Final 
 Akademischer EHC Zürich - Club des Patineurs Lausanne 7:2

External links 
Swiss Ice Hockey Federation – All-time results

National
Swiss International Ice Hockey Championship seasons